The Immediate Geographic Region of Formiga is one of the 6 immediate geographic regions in the Intermediate Geographic Region of Divinópolis, one of the 70 immediate geographic regions in the Brazilian state of Minas Gerais and one of the 509 of Brazil, created by the National Institute of Geography and Statistics (IBGE) in 2017.

Municipalities 
It comprises 10 municipalities.

 Arcos  
 Bambuí  
 Córrego Danta    
 Córrego Fundo   
 Formiga 
 Iguatama  
 Medeiros     
 Pains  
 Pimenta  
 Tapiraí

See also 

 List of Intermediate and Immediate Geographic Regions of Minas Gerais

References 

Geography of Minas Gerais